Sirula is a village in the municipality of Ohrid, North Macedonia. It used to be part of the former municipality of Kosel.

Name 
The placename Sirula<Sirulja and the possible suffix -ja stems from the name Sirul of which along with its suffix -ul is  derived from an Aromanian foundation alongside sir.

Demographics

According to the 2002 census, the village had a total of 10 inhabitants. Ethnic groups in the village include:

Macedonians 10

See also
Arbinovo
Botun
Laktinje
Kuratica

References

Villages in Ohrid Municipality